Opus III or Opus 3 may refer to: 

Opus 3 of various composers, see Op. 3 (disambiguation)
Opus-3 Lithuanian National Radio and Television
Opus 3 Artists
Opus III (band) 1992–1994

See also
Opus 111, French classical record label